The Palace of the Holy Office is a building in Rome which is an extraterritorial property of Vatican City. It houses the Holy Office of the Roman Catholic Church. 

The palace is situated south of Saint Peter's Basilica near the Petrine Gate to Vatican City. The building lies outside the confines of Vatican City at the south-eastern corner of the city-state. It is one of the properties of the Holy See in Italy regulated by the 1929 Lateran Treaty signed with the Kingdom of Italy. As such, it has extraterritorial status.

The palace was first built after 1514 for Cardinal Lorenzo Pucci, and it was called Palazzo Pucci. Its façade was rebuilt in 1524–1525 by the architects Giuliano Leni, Pietro Roselli and even Michelangelo. When Pucci died in 1531, the building was still not fully completed.

In 1566–1567, the palace was purchased by Pope Pius V for 9000 scudi, and it was converted into the seat of the Holy Office. Renovation works were undertaken by Pirro Ligorio and Giovanni Sallustio Peruzzi. A complete renovation of the building was made by Pietro Guidi between 1921 and 1925.

It is where Cardinal Joseph Ratzinger formerly worked as Prefect of the Congregation.

See also

Index of Vatican City-related articles

References

Dicastery for the Doctrine of the Faith
Extraterritorial properties of the Holy See in Rome
Rome R. XIV Borgo
Palaces in Rome